Gerrit Christian Walberg Jr. (June 10, 1921 – March 27, 2012) was an American character actor primarily known for his work on television. He performed in numerous TV shows from the early 1950s until the early 1990s, including Johnny Staccato, Perry Mason, Lassie, Peyton Place, Gunsmoke (in 1959 as “Tobe” in “Buffalo Hunter”, in 1961 as “Hatcher” in “A Man and A Day”, in 1963 as “Anson” in “Two of a Kind” and in 1974 as “Toby” in “The Tarnished Badge”), The Fugitive, Star Trek, Columbo, The Tony Randall Show and The Rockford Files. He appeared in the first episode of The Twilight Zone, titled "Where Is Everybody?".

The Buffalo, New York-born Walberg was probably best known for his role as LAPD Homicide Lt. Frank Monahan in Quincy, M.E. (1976–83), starring his good friend, Jack Klugman in the title role. Walberg had previously appeared alongside Klugman in The Odd Couple (1970–75) in the recurring role of Oscar's poker crony, Homer "Speed" Deegan. He reprised the role in the 1993 TV movie The Odd Couple: Together Again. This was his final acting appearance.

Personal life and death
Married and divorced twice, Walberg married his third wife, Florence M. Apostol, on September 12, 1987.

Walberg died from chronic pulmonary disease and congestive heart failure in March 2012 in Northridge, California, at the age of 90. In the months prior to his passing, he was a player in the Carl Memorial Alzheimer's Poker Game, where he lived.

Partial filmography

References

External links

1921 births
2012 deaths
20th-century American male actors
American male television actors
Male actors from Buffalo, New York
Respiratory disease deaths in California
Deaths from chronic obstructive pulmonary disease
Deaths from congestive heart failure